Riverside Rowing Club Incorporated (RRC) is a non profit association located in South Australia. RRC has a strong Masters Rowing focus (27 years and over) and actively supports senior and school rowing.

RRC competitive rowers race in local Rowing SA regattas, Rowing Australia Regattas, and World Masters Games. and International Rowing Federation(FISA) regattas held around the globe. Annually a number of crews compete in Head Races including the Head of the Yarra in Melbourne Victoria.
The club's membership includes recreational (non-competitive) rowers and regularly holds "Learn to Row" programs throughout the year.

History 

The club was formed in 1943 in South Australia, and was originally known as the South Australian Railways Institute Rowing Club (SARIRC). In 1977 the club was renamed the Australian National Railways Institute Rowing Club (Central region). In 1994 the club changed its name to the Riverside Rowing Club.

The Clubrooms 

The Riverside clubhouse is a two storey building located on the banks of the River Torrens, approximately 100 meters west of the Victoria Bridge (Morphett Street Bridge) towards the weir. The upper storey of the clubhouse includes a veranda overlooking the Torrens, and contains a bar, kitchen and change rooms for use by members, as well as a collection of memorabilia, photographs and awards reflecting the club's history. A boat storage area, gym, Concept2 indoor rower equipment are located on the ground floor of the building.

The current building on the River Torrens was renovated in 2002.

Since 2005 Riverside has also operated out of a bay at the Rowing SA complex located at West Lakes.

Colours and Motto 

The club colours are red, green and yellow.
The club motto is Possent quia posse videntum. They Won because they thought they could.

RRC's mission statement is "to provide the necessary resources and support to encourage participation and competition in rowing and develop successful involvement at all levels in the sport."

Club Traditions 

The Wald Cup regatta held annually on the Torrens was first held in 1945.
The Goldsworthy Cup an internal regatta held annually on the Torrens in honour of Stan Goldsworthy, first held in 2003.

Notable members 

The club has many past notable members including:

Graeme King - internationally recognised racing boat designer and builder began rowing at the age of 16 at the South Australian Railways Institute Rowing Club (SARIRC)in 1963.
Mike Nielsen - represented SA in winning King's Cup crew 1981, 1982 and 1983.
Elaine Guterres - Order of Australia Medal recipient in the Queen’s Birthday Honors List 2012 for her contribution to rowing
 Alison Davies - dual Olympian and a junior world champion.

Bibliography 

 Orr, Hugh(2011) One Club, Three Names: The History of the Riverside Rowing Club Adelaide, South Australia 1943-2009
 Burgoine, Garth(2000) Memories of the South Australian Railways Institute Rowing Club

Notes

External links 

 Riverside Rowing Club Website
 South Australian Rowing Association Website
 Rowing SA Affiliated Club
 Rowing Australia Affiliated Club

1943 establishments in Australia
Sports clubs established in 1943
Sporting clubs in Adelaide
Rowing clubs in Australia